Kristofor Lawrence Griffin (born May 27, 1981) is a former American football linebacker. He was originally signed by the Kansas City Chiefs as an undrafted free agent in 2005. He played college football at Indiana University of Pennsylvania. His younger brother Kirby Griffin played in the Arena Football League. Now he resides in Katy, Texas where he works at Tays Junior high school as a boy's athletic coach.

He was also a member of the Cleveland Browns, Jacksonville Jaguars and Las Vegas Locomotives.

High school years
Griffin attended Rochester Area High School where he played both at safety and wide receiver. He was a key member of the team's undefeated 15-0 PIAA Class A State Championship team in 1998.

College career
He played in 18 contests at Geneva College, producing 109 tackles, 24 tackles for loss, 7 sacks and 8 interceptions. Griffin then transferred to Indiana University of Pennsylvania, where he played in 22 games, recording 152 tackles, 38 tackles for loss, 12 sacks, 11 interceptions and seven passes defensed. He majored in sports administration.

Professional career

2005
Griffin was signed by the Kansas City Chiefs as an undrafted rookie free agent. He made his NFL debut at the Denver Broncos on September 26. During his first season he played in eight games and made three tackles.

2006
He was allocated to NFL Europe and played for the Hamburg Sea Devils where he made ten appearances and nine starts. During his time there he made 41 tackles. When he returned to training camp for the Chiefs he established himself within the special teams. He played in all 16 games and made 22 special teams tackles.

2007
On May 23, 2007, NFL Network reported that Griffin was released by the Chiefs. He later signed with the Cleveland Browns. He played in twelve games and recorded a total of 14 tackles.

2008
Played in 10 games for the Cleveland Browns, recording a total of 7 tackles.

2010
Griffin was signed by the Jacksonville Jaguars on August 8.

References

External links
Just Sports Stats

1981 births
Living people
People from Rochester, Pennsylvania
Players of American football from Pennsylvania
American football linebackers
Geneva Golden Tornadoes football players
IUP Crimson Hawks football players
Kansas City Chiefs players
Hamburg Sea Devils players
Cleveland Browns players
Las Vegas Locomotives players
Jacksonville Jaguars players